Elsfjord is a village in Vefsn Municipality in Nordland county, Norway. Elsfjord Church is located in the village.

The village was the administrative centre of the old municipality of Elsfjord during its existence from 1929 to 1964.

The Nordlandsbanen railway line passes through the village, stopping at Elsfjord Station.

References

See also
Prison camps in North Norway during World War Two, including at Elsfjord

Villages in Nordland
Vefsn
Populated places of Arctic Norway